God of War is an action-adventure game franchise created by David Jaffe at Sony's Santa Monica Studio. It began in 2005 on the PlayStation 2 (PS2) video game console and has become a flagship series for PlayStation, consisting of nine installments across multiple platforms. Based on ancient mythologies, the story follows Kratos, a Spartan warrior and later the Greek God of War, who was tricked into killing his family by his former master, the original Greek God of War Ares. This sets off a series of events that leads to wars with the different mythological pantheons. The Greek-based games see Kratos follow a path of vengeance due to the machinations of the Olympian gods, while the Norse-based games, which introduce his son Atreus as a secondary protagonist, show Kratos on a path of redemption and inadvertently coming into conflict with the Norse gods.

Santa Monica has developed all main entries, while Ready at Dawn and Javaground/Sony Online Entertainment-Los Angeles (SOE-LA) developed the three side games. Sony Interactive Entertainment (SIE) has published all games except the mobile phone installment, which was published by Sony Pictures Digital. The first seven games make up the Greek era of the franchise. God of War (2005), God of War II (2007), and God of War III (2010) comprise its main trilogy; the first two were released on the PS2 with the third on the PlayStation 3 (PS3). A prequel, Ascension (2013), was also released for the PS3. Other games include Chains of Olympus (2008) and Ghost of Sparta (2010) for the PlayStation Portable (PSP) and Betrayal (2007) for mobile phones that supported the Java Platform, Micro Edition (Java ME). The Norse era began with the 2018 game God of War and released for the PlayStation 4 (PS4) and later Windows in January 2022. It was accompanied by a short prequel, A Call from the Wilds (2018), a text-based game through Facebook Messenger. A sequel, Ragnarök, was released in November 2022 on the PS4 and PlayStation 5 (PS5) and concluded the Norse era.

Games in the series have been praised as some of the best action games of all time. The series has received numerous awards, including several Game of the Year recognitions for the 2005 and 2018 installments. Some games have also been remastered for newer PlayStation platforms. As of November 2020, the franchise has sold over 51 million games worldwide. Strong sales and support of the series led to the franchise's expansion into other media, such as three comic book series and three novels. A film adaptation of the original installment had been in development but was ultimately canceled; however, a television series adaptation of the Norse era is in development for Amazon Prime Video. Merchandise includes artwork, clothing, toys, and prop replicas, as well as the games' soundtracks, including a heavy metal album, Blood & Metal (2010), featuring original music by various bands who were inspired by the series.

Games

First era (Greek mythology)
God of War was first released in North America on March 22, 2005, for the PlayStation 2. After ten years in the service of the Olympian gods, Spartan soldier Kratos is tasked by Athena to find Pandora's box, the key to defeating Ares, the God of War, who is running amok through Athens. A series of flashbacks reveals that Kratos was once the servant of Ares, who saved Kratos and his army from annihilation in battle, but tricked him into killing his family, which forced his metamorphosis into the "Ghost of Sparta". Kratos eventually finds Pandora's Box, and after finally killing Ares, he ascends to Mount Olympus to become the new God of War.

God of War II was first released in North America on March 13, 2007, for the PlayStation 2. Angered at his fellow gods, Kratos runs amok across the city of Rhodes. Zeus intervenes and betrays Kratos, who is saved by the Titan Gaia. She tells him he must now find the Sisters of Fate, who can change his fate and prevent his death at the hands of Zeus. Kratos is ultimately successful and as he is about to kill the god, Athena sacrifices herself to save Zeus and preserve Olympus, and tells Kratos that he is Zeus' son and that he betrayed Kratos out of fear. Kratos then joins forces with Gaia and the Titans to attack Olympus.

God of War: Betrayal was released on June 20, 2007, for mobile phones supporting the Java Platform, Micro Edition. It is the only game in the series to be released as a two-dimensional (2D) side-scroller and the first that was released on a non-PlayStation platform. The narrative of the game takes place between the events of Ghost of Sparta and God of War II. Kratos is framed for murder, and rampages across Greece seeking the true assassin. Kratos succumbs to bloodlust and kills Ceryx, the son of the god Hermes—an act that alienates him from his fellow gods.

God of War: Chains of Olympus was first released in North America on March 4, 2008, for the PlayStation Portable. Its narrative takes place sometime between Ascension and God of War during Kratos' ten years of service to the gods. Kratos halts a Persian invasion of the Greek city of Attica, and learns that the world has been plunged into darkness by the god Morpheus. Kratos investigates the abduction of the sun god Helios, and prevents the Machiavellian plan of the goddess Persephone to use the Titan Atlas to destroy the world.

God of War III was first released in North America on March 16, 2010, for the PlayStation 3. Reigniting the Great War, Kratos is soon abandoned by the Titans, who were only using him to exact their own revenge. Now seeking revenge against both the Titans and Olympian gods, he is helped by the spirit of Athena, who was elevated to a new level of understanding and instructs him to seek the Flame of Olympus in order to defeat Zeus. Kratos engages the gods and the Titans in a series of battles across the Underworld and Olympus and learns that Pandora's Box is within the Flame. He discovers that Pandora herself is the key to pacifying the Flame and allowing him to open the Box, at the expense of her life. After finally killing Zeus and with Olympus destroyed, Kratos refuses to help Athena assume the role of new patron of mankind and disappears.

God of War: Ghost of Sparta was first released in North America on November 2, 2010, for the PlayStation Portable. Set between the events of God of War and Betrayal, the God of War Kratos is still haunted by visions of his mortal past and embarks on a quest to discover his origins by finding his mother, Callisto. He learns that his brother Deimos was taken by the gods and imprisoned by the God of Death, Thanatos, and decides to find and save his sibling. Although successful, Thanatos engages the brothers in combat, and kills Deimos. Kratos then kills Thanatos and returns to Olympus, further enraged at the gods.

God of War: Ascension was first released in North America on March 12, 2013, for the PlayStation 3. It is the only game in the series to feature multiplayer, which is online-only for both competitive and cooperative play. Predating Chains of Olympus, the game is set roughly six months after Kratos was tricked into killing his wife and daughter, and sees him imprisoned by the three Furies for breaking his blood oath to Ares. With the help of the oath keeper and Ares' estranged son Orkos, Kratos learns that the God of War and the Furies plan to overthrow Mount Olympus and that Ares chose Kratos as his servant to help him for that very purpose. The Spartan escapes his imprisonment and eventually kills the Furies, as well as Orkos, who begs for release. Although free of Ares' bond, Kratos begins to suffer the nightmares that plague him for years.

Second era (Norse mythology)
God of War: A Call from the Wilds is a short text-based game, released through Facebook Messenger on February 1, 2018. The game serves as a prequel story to 2018's God of War, and follows Atreus on his first adventure in the Norse wilds. Additionally, a smartphone companion app called Mimir's Vision released on April 17, 2018, and provides some background for the Norse setting.

God of War was released worldwide on April 20, 2018, for the PlayStation 4, and for Windows (PC) through Steam on January 14, 2022, which marked the first main installment released on a non-PlayStation platform. The game was a new direction for the series, not only by its new mythological setting, but also by its gameplay. Many years after the events of God of War III, Kratos has ended up in the world of Norse mythology in ancient Norway in the realm of Midgard, and has a son named Atreus. After Kratos' second wife—Atreus' mother—Faye passes away, the two set out on a journey to fulfill her final wish of spreading her ashes at the highest peak of the nine realms, later revealed to be in Jötunheim by new ally Mímir. Along their journey, they are attacked by the Æsir god Baldur, who was sent by the Allfather Odin to get to Faye in order to prevent Ragnarök, unaware she had died. After Kratos eventually kills Baldur, the three-year-long Fimbulwinter begins, with Ragnarök soon to follow. While Baldur's mother, the Vanir goddess Freya, swears revenge on Kratos, he and Atreus complete their journey and discover that Faye was a Giant who had foreseen the future and that Atreus was originally named Loki.

God of War Ragnarök was released worldwide on November 9, 2022, for the PlayStation 4 and the PlayStation 5, marking the first cross-gen release in the series. At the end of the three-year Fimbulwinter, Kratos, Atreus, and Mímir are confronted by Odin and the God of Thunder Thor. After dueling Thor, the three set out on a journey across the nine realms in hopes of finding a way to prevent the world-ending event, Ragnarök. Along the way, they are confronted by a vengeful Freya, but they eventually make amends. Unable to prevent Ragnarök—which is discovered to only destroy Asgard, the home of the Æsir—Kratos, Atreus, and their allies unite the realms in a war against the Æsir gods in their home realm. Kratos battles Thor once again, but Thor is killed by Odin for refusing to kill Kratos. Kratos, Atreus, Mímir, and Freya then engage Odin in battle and defeat the Allfather as Asgard is destroyed. Returning home to Midgard, Atreus, as Loki, decides that he needs to go and find any remaining Giants and bids a heartfelt farewell while Kratos learns that he is destined to become a revered god. Along with Freya and Mímir, they begin to rebuild the realms and restore peace.

Collections and remasters

God of War Collection was first released in North America on November 17, 2009, for the PlayStation 3—the franchise's first appearance on the platform. It is a remastered port of the original God of War and God of War II. The games were ported by Bluepoint Games and feature high-definition 1080p anti-aliased graphics at 60 frames per second and trophies. Sanzaru Games later ported the collection to the PlayStation Vita and it was released in May 2014—the franchise's only appearance on this platform.

God of War: Origins Collection was first released in North America on September 13, 2011, for the PlayStation 3. It is a remastered port of the two PlayStation Portable installments in the series—Chains of Olympus and Ghost of Sparta. God of War Origins was ported by Ready at Dawn and features 1080p high-definition video, anti-aliased graphics at 60 frames per second, DualShock 3 rumble features, trophies, and it is the only God of War release to feature Stereoscopic 3D.

God of War Saga was released in North America on August 28, 2012. It is a collection of five of the God of War games for the PlayStation 3, released as part of Sony's PlayStation Collections line. The collection includes the original God of War, God of War II, God of War III, Chains of Olympus, and Ghost of Sparta. It features two Blu-ray Discs—God of War I and II on the first and III on the second—and a voucher to download Chains of Olympus and Ghost of Sparta. The games retain the same features as their first PS3 releases.

God of War III Remastered was first released in North America on July 14, 2015, for the PlayStation 4—the franchise's first appearance on the platform. It is a remastered version of God of War III, and features full 1080p support targeted at 60 frames per second, a photo mode, and all downloadable content of the original. The game's announcement and release was in celebration of the franchise's tenth anniversary. It was ported by Wholesale Algorithms.

Gameplay
The series consists of eight single-player-only games, and one that includes multiplayer. Throughout the first era, the games featured a third-person, fixed cinematic camera with the exception of Betrayal, which is the only installment to feature a 2D side-scrolling view. For 2018's God of War and Ragnarök, the camera was switched from being fixed and became an over-the-shoulder free camera. A first-person camera is featured in God of War III and Ascension during certain scripted sequences. Throughout the series, the player controls the character Kratos in a combination of hack and slash combat, platforming, and puzzle game elements to achieve goals and complete the story (platforming elements were removed from the second era games due to the camera change). The 2018 installment added Kratos' son Atreus, and although the game is played entirely as Kratos, there are times when the player may choose to passively control Atreus (a button is dedicated to Atreus, and he will fire an arrow from his bow depending on where the camera is pointed). While Atreus is still an accompanying character in Ragnarök (in addition to a couple of other characters), there are some story missions where the player takes full control of Atreus; his combat is similar to Kratos' but he uses a bow.

Throughout the Greek games, Kratos' main weapon is a pair of double-chained blades that appear in three iterations: the Blades of Chaos, the Blades of Athena (or Athena's Blades), and the Blades of Exile. They each perform similarly, but differ in the types of combos and amount of damage each yields, as well as cosmetic differences. Other weapons are also obtained during the games and vary in gameplay. Magic is also used, and four abilities are typically acquired. God of War III differs in that instead of separate abilities, there are four primary weapons that possess their own respective magic offensive. The game also features "Items"—additional secondary weapons with limited usage, such as the Bow of Apollo. With each new game, most weapons and magic are lost via a plot device, and a new arsenal of weapons and abilities are acquired during gameplay. Ascension differs from the previous games in that instead of acquiring new weapons that are kept throughout the entire game, the player collects up to five World Weapons (such as a sword or a javelin) that have limited usage. When there is not a World Weapon equipped, the player can punch or kick foes as part of a new mechanic added to the game. In the Norse games, Kratos' primary weapon is a magical battle axe called the Leviathan Axe. It can be thrown and summoned back to his hand, similar to Thor's hammer Mjölnir. Later on in 2018's God of War, he recovers the Blades of Chaos, which is retained in Ragnarök. They perform similarly as they did during the Greek games, but with different abilities. Both the Leviathan Axe and Blades of Chaos, as well as the Draupnir Spear introduced in Ragnarök, can be upgraded to use special magical attacks called runic attacks. Each weapon has a light and heavy runic attack, and the player can choose which runic attacks to equip on the weapons.

The series offers combo-based combat, and includes a quick time event (QTE) feature, also called context sensitive attacks, which is initiated when the player has weakened a foe or to perform a defensive maneuver. It allows limited control of Kratos during the QTE cinematic sequence; success ends the battle, while failure usually results in damage to the player. As well as the QTE system, Ascension features a prompt-less free-form system, allowing players the choice of when to attack or dodge based on the enemy's actions. A grab maneuver can be used on minor foes. The Norse games changed this up; after an enemy has been weakened enough, a prompt will appear above its head, and depending on the enemy, Kratos may rip it in half or grab them and throw them into other enemies, among other possible outcomes. He will also jump on top of and ride large enemies, such as ogres, causing them to attack other enemies, similar to the cyclopes in the Greek games.

Relics, which the player can use in successive games (such as Poseidon's Trident obtained in the original God of War allowing Kratos to swim underwater for extended periods) are also found and necessary for game progression. Kratos often has a special ability, which provides temporary invulnerability and increased attack damage. This ability has become an ongoing feature of gameplay throughout the series—Rage of the Gods in the original God of War and Ascension, Rage of the Titans in God of War II, Rage of Sparta in God of War III, and Thera's Bane in Ghost of Sparta. This ability can be recharged by building hits on foes in combat, and gaining game-specific orbs. Thera's Bane, however, is recharged automatically. While Kratos does not retain any relics from the Greek era in 2018's God of War, he does have a rage ability, called Spartan Rage, and with this ability, Kratos uses powerful bare-handed attacks, as opposed to weapons, to greatly damage enemies. Ragnarök enhanced the Spartan Rage ability, giving two other variants, one providing health and another delivering a powerful weapon attack depending on the weapon equipped.

Gorgon Eyes and Phoenix Feathers, found throughout the Greek games in unmarked chests (white chests in Ascension), increase the maximum amount of health and magic, respectively. Minotaur Horns, which increase the Items and Fire meter's maximum length, are available in God of War III and Ghost of Sparta, respectively. The Items meter allows the use of secondary weapons, called Items, and the Fire meter allows the use of the Thera's Bane ability. The meters are increased in increments and reach their maximum once a certain number of Eyes, Feathers, and Horns are found. Other chests contain green, blue, or red orbs. Green orbs replenish the player's health, blue orbs replenish magic allowing further usage, and red orbs provide experience points (XP) for upgrading weapons and magic for new, more powerful attacks, and replenish the Rage meter in the original God of War. Gold orbs found in God of War II and Ascension, and white orbs in God of War III, replenish the Rage meter instead of red orbs; the Rage meter in Ascension is also refilled by landing attacks on foes. Chests with changing colors, which allow players to choose which meter to replenish, have also been available. Red orbs can also be collected by killing foes and destroying certain inanimate objects. Bosses and more powerful opponents release a combination of colored orbs when killed via the quick-time feature. For the Norse games, Apples of Iðunn replaced the Gorgon Eyes to increase the maximum length of the health meter, while Horns of Blood Mead increase the maximum length of the rage meter. While the Norse games retain green and red orbs to replenish the health and rage meters, respectively, magic is done differently. Instead of collecting blue orbs to replenish magic, there is a cool down time on magical runic attacks, and once that cool down time is up, the magical runic attack can be used again. Furthermore, players accumulate different crafting resources, primarily Hacksilver, to create and purchase new items, such as new armor or upgrading existing armor and weapons, and XP is used for learning new combat skills. Chests in the Norse games provide a variety of different items.

With the exception of Ascension, each installment offers a challenge mode, which yields extra red orbs (or XP), secret costumes, and behind-the-scenes videos. Bonus content can also be unlocked by defeating the game's difficulty levels. The Norse games also include a challenge mode, located in the realm Muspelheim, which rewards various items upon completion. Battle arenas, which allow players to set difficulty levels and choose their own opponents, are included in God of War II, God of War III, and Ghost of Sparta. Excluding Betrayal, the Greek games were known for including a quick-time sex minigame in each installment until Ascension, which dropped the mini-game.

Ascension is the only installment in the series to feature multiplayer, which is online-only for both competitive and cooperative play. Up to eight players on two teams of two to four players (or a four to eight player deathmatch) battle for control of a map in order to earn rewards from the gods. Players can also fight each other in one-on-one matches. Players must sell their champion's soul to either Zeus, Hades, Ares, or Poseidon, which allows players to try different weapons, armor sets, and powers inspired by the god of their choice, and extras can be unlocked.

Development

Main series

PlayStation 2
After the success of their first game Kinetica (2001), Santa Monica Studio began development of the original God of War in 2002, and unveiled it two years later at SCEA Santa Monica Gamers' Day 2004. Game director and creator David Jaffe said that although the idea for God of War was his own, the concept owed a debt to Capcom because he had played Onimusha and said "let's do that with Greek mythology". He was inspired in part by the 1981 feature film, Clash of the Titans, saying, "the real high concept for me was ... merging it with Heavy Metal magazine". He said he liked both "the kids stuff ... with Greek mythology" and the idea of adding more adult themes such as sex and violence. He was also inspired by the 1981 film Raiders of the Lost Ark. Although the game is based on Greek mythology, the development team gave themselves "lots of freedom" to modify the myths, and Jaffe said they took the "coolest aspects of the subject" and created art and story using those elements. Director of visual development and lead concept artist, Charlie Wen, drew inspiration from these films as well as more contemporary films such as Gladiator (2000) for tonal inspiration to lead the visual design of Kratos, other characters, and the world of God of War. The gameplay of the Strider arcade franchise was also a vital influence on God of War, and the developers described the gameplay "as merging the action of Devil May Cry with the puzzle-solving of Ico" and noted that players would be able to "sunder enemies with a single move, such as by ripping them in half". The game uses Santa Monica's Kinetica engine, which they developed for Kinetica.

A sequel to God of War was first teased at the end of its credits, which stated, "Kratos Will Return". God of War II was officially announced at the 2006 Game Developers Conference (GDC). David Jaffe stepped down and became the creative director of its sequel and God of Wars lead animator Cory Barlog assumed the role of game director. Barlog said that in the game, players would see "a larger view of Kratos' role within the mythological world." Like God of War, the game uses Santa Monica's Kinetica engine. Magic attacks became an integral part of the combat system and it was more refined. New creatures and heroes from the mythology, and more boss battles were added. Both Jaffe and Barlog said that they did not view God of War II as a sequel, but rather a continuation of the previous game. Jaffe said that they did not want to include the Roman numeral number two (II) in the title for this reason, but they did not want the title to convey the impression it was an expansion pack. Both Jaffe and Barlog said that the reason God of War II appeared on the PlayStation 2 instead of the PlayStation 3—which was released four months prior to God of War II—was because "there's a 100 million people out there that will be able to play God of War II as soon as it launches." Barlog assured that the game would be playable on the newer platform, which originally had PlayStation 2 backwards compatibility.

PlayStation 3
God of War III was first mentioned by Cory Barlog at a God of War II launch event, and it was officially announced at the 2008 Electronic Entertainment Expo (E3). After serving as game director during the first eight months of development, Barlog left Santa Monica for other opportunities and Stig Asmussen took on the role, having previously been the lead environment artist and art director on God of War and God of War II, respectively. Asmussen said that one of the greatest challenges in developing God of War III for the PlayStation 3 was the "complexity of everything"; individual tasks, such as designing Helios' decapitation, could take a year because the "level of detail [that was] expected [was] so high and intricate, it [crossed] multiple departments." He said that the PlayStation 3's hardware capabilities allowed more flexibility in character creation and interaction with the environment. The engine for God of War III was ported from the first two installments to the PlayStation 3. As the game was being developed, the code department swapped out PlayStation 2 components with PlayStation 3 components. They replaced the renderer, the particle system, and the collision system. Although they were re-using the engine from God of War II, the core engine for God of War III was brand new. Between E3 2009 and the time the game shipped, morphological anti-aliasing (MLAA) was added, which graphics engineer Ben Diamand said "improved edges dramatically and saved substantial amounts of frame-rate." Diamand also said that "depth-of-field, motion blur, crepuscular 'God' rays and refraction were either added or improved in quality and speed" during that same time period.

On April 12, 2012, Sony released a teaser image for Ascension on its official PlayStation Facebook page, which was followed by the game's announcement on April 19 on PlayStation.Blog. Todd Papy, who had previously worked as a designer on God of War and God of War II and as design director on God of War III, assumed the role of game director; God of War III director Stig Asmussen was busy with another project at Santa Monica and did not work on Ascension. The announcement officially confirmed the game's title and Papy said it was not titled God of War IV to avoid confusion because it is a prequel, rather than a sequel, to the trilogy. The game features a retooled God of War III engine, enabling online multiplayer battles for up to eight players. The decision to add multiplayer came about from curiosity, according to lead combat designer Jason McDonald. The multiplayer was first tested using Kratos, and McDonald said the testers had "a lot of fun". Seeing their reaction made the team feel that the multiplayer had value and they then began to put the "God of War spin on it". In the developmental transition from God of War III to Ascension, one of the graphics engineers, Cedric Perthuis, noted that the limits of the God of War III engine restricted artist creativity, so they "tried to remove or push those limits as far as possible without losing any performance." Ascension did not have a graphical leap over its predecessor like God of War III did. Dynamic lighting was added, which allowed for development of the Life Cycle gameplay mechanic. Particle effects were also greatly improved upon from God of War III.

PlayStation 4 and PlayStation 5
Santa Monica began work on the fifth main installment in 2014, which was confirmed by the returning Cory Barlog at the first annual PlayStation Experience on December 6 that year. The official announcement came at the 2016 Electronic Entertainment Expo (E3) with a gameplay demo, which also confirmed that Barlog had returned to the series as game director. The game was deliberately titled God of War with no numeral or subtitle because although it is a continuation of the series, "we [reimagined] everything." Other mythologies were also considered for the new setting, but Norse was picked to keep the focus on Kratos; there was also consideration to use a different protagonist, but it was decided to keep Kratos as he "is intrinsically tied" to the series. In adapting the Norse myths, Barlog said there were so many different translations and interpretations, and just like they did with Greek mythology in the previous games, they found ways to parallel path things from the myths to fit their story. Most of the development team that worked on the original God of War worked on the new installment. They claimed that they matched the new gameplay with the same level of accessibility as the previous installments. Some gameplay characteristics found in the previous installments were cut, such as jumping, swimming, and instant-death platforming challenges; these were cut due to the camera being closer to Kratos. Although Ascension had introduced multiplayer to the series, the team dropped the mode to focus on the single-player experience. The Leviathan Axe was chosen as Kratos' new main weapon because the developers wanted a more grounded direction for the game. Although the game never reaches this number, the enemy count was increased to be able to support up to 100 enemies on-screen; God of War III and Ascension could do up to 50. Although the game was built for the standard PlayStation 4, Barlog confirmed that it would "benefit from the power" of the PlayStation 4 Pro; an updated version of the PlayStation 4 that can render games in 4K resolution and was released a few months after God of War was announced. The game's story was estimated to take 25–35 hours to complete, which is significantly more than the previous four main installments, which each took an average of 10 hours to complete. As part of Sony's larger efforts to port their first-party exclusive games to Windows, Santa Monica Studio announced in October 2021 that God of War would be released for Windows on January 14, 2022, with support for graphics options. This in turn marked the first main entry in the series to release on a non-PlayStation platform.
 
Following the announcement of the 2018 installment in June 2016, Cory Barlog confirmed that the 2018 game would not be Kratos' last. The ending of the 2018 installment also teased a sequel; it ended with Ragnarök looming, as well as a secret ending that showed a vision of the Æsir god Thor confronting Kratos and Atreus at the end of Fimbulwinter. During the 2020 PlayStation 5 (PS5) Showcase event on September 16, a new God of War was officially announced for a 2021 release on the newer console. When the game was first announced, it was only announced as a PS5 title; however, in June 2021, it was confirmed that the game would release on both the PS4 and PS5, marking the first cross-gen release in the series. Development was partly impacted by the COVID-19 pandemic, resulting in the game being delayed to 2022. In September 2021, the game's title was confirmed as God of War Ragnarök. During the 2021 PlayStation Showcase event, Eric Williams, who worked on every previous installment, was confirmed as the game's director, continuing the previous era's tradition of having a different director for each game; Barlog served as a producer on Ragnarök. It was also during this event that it was confirmed that Ragnarök would be the finale to the Norse era of the series. The main reason Santa Monica decided to end the Norse era with Ragnarök was due to the game's size and scale. The 2018 installment and Ragnarök each respectively took five years to develop, and they did not want to take another five years, totaling 15 years, to tell one story. The game supports options for players to run the game in either higher resolution or better performance, including 4K at 30 frames per second (fps), 1080p resolution at 60fps, a high frame resolution mode in 4K at 40fps, and a high frame performance mode that syncs to 120 hertz. The latter two high frame options are only available for the PS5 version of the game and require monitors with HDMI 2.1. Due to the game also being on PS4, it does not fully utilize the capabilities of the PS5. The PS4 version is a visual improvement over the 2018 installment while the PS5 version "is essentially an enhancement of what's already possible [on the PS4]". The game does, however, include several features exclusive to the PS5 hardware, such as 3D audio, haptic feedback, higher frame rate, and overall better graphics.

Future
Prior to the release of the 2018 installment, Cory Barlog confirmed that after the Norse era, future games could see the series tackling either Egyptian or Maya mythology. He also said that although the 2018 installment (and subsequently Ragnarök) focused on Norse, it alluded to the fact that there are other mythologies co-existing in the world. Barlog also said that he liked the idea of having different directors for each game and although he may not direct another God of War, he would still be at Santa Monica to work on future games.

Side games

PlayStation Portable
Game developer Ready at Dawn pitched the idea of a God of War game for the PlayStation Portable to Santa Monica Studio soon after the original God of War launched. Cory Barlog officially confirmed the development of Chains of Olympus at a God of War II launch event, stating "It is its own story that connects to the overall story." Chains of Olympus uses a proprietary, in-house engine referred to as the Ready at Dawn engine, which expanded on the engine created for their previous game, Daxter (2006). Originally designed for the PlayStation Portable's restricted 222-megahertz (MHz) processor, Ready at Dawn convinced Sony to increase the clock speed of the PSP to 333-MHz, which they did in a firmware upgrade. The faster processor allowed for more realistic blood effects, lighting effects, and shadows as well as improved enemy intelligence, but noticeably decreased battery life. After the game's completion, game director Ru Weerasuriya stated multiplayer options and other puzzles, characters, and dialogue had to be removed due to time constraints.

Ghost of Sparta was announced on May 4, 2010, on PlayStation.Blog. According to Sony, Ready at Dawn utilized "state-of-the-art visual technologies" that allowed "higher quality environments and characters." Ghost of Sparta offers "over 25% more gameplay" than Chains of Olympus, while adding more enemies on screen and more boss encounters. Development of Ghost of Sparta took 23 months to complete. Due to Weerasuriya's schedule at Ready at Dawn, he could not return to direct; Dana Jan, the lead level designer for Chains of Olympus, became director for Ghost of Sparta. At Comic-Con 2010, Jan noted that when development began in 2008, the goal was to make the game bigger than Chains of Olympus, which had apparently pushed the PSP to its functional limits. Jan stated that Ghost of Sparta took the PSP to its "absolute capacity", with another feature being more on-screen foes. The game concept was originally used as a teaser for players who obtained the platinum trophy from God of War III. The trophy revealed a site called spartansstandtall.com, which became the official site for Ghost of Sparta on May 4. Jan stated the reason they chose to have the game take place between God of War and God of War II was because "It seemed to make a lot of sense to fill in that void."

Mobile
Betrayal was announced by Sony Online Entertainment at a press conference in Los Angeles in May 2007. The game utilizes a total of 110 different animations and features a 2D rendition of the series' three-dimensional (3D) graphics. Game director Phil Cohen said that although the game was enjoyable to develop, the greatest challenge was creating a single tileset and palette swapping scheme that was diverse enough to portray multiple environments with only several hundred kilobytes, and that met Santa Monica Studio's high standards. Cohen wrote the initial design document between September and October 2005, and revisited it in August 2006, the month development started. The versions for high-end handsets were completed in April 2007, with final versions for low-end handsets completed by June 2007. The porting team adapted the game to over 200 handsets in a matter of weeks. Both David Jaffe and Cory Barlog ensured that the Betrayal development team captured the feel of the combat and visual style, and were "helpful with feedback and positive support".

Adaptations

Live action

Unproduced feature film
A film adaptation of the first game was announced in 2005. Creator David Jaffe confirmed that a completed script had been written by David Self and would be sent to an unspecified director. He said that Universal Studios was behind the making of the God of War movie, but was unaware of its status, and eventually said, "it's doubtful that the film will even be made." In September 2010, Jaffe said that the "script went out a year and a half ago to Daniel Craig who plays [James] Bond, but he turned it down." He also said that another actor had since been cast as Kratos; he said, "this new person is pretty good, if that ends up true." In July 2012, The Hollywood Reporter said that writers Patrick Melton and Marcus Dunstan had been hired to adapt the God of War film. The writers told IGN that they intended to "humanize" Kratos and explore his past. Melton said that they were emotionally invested and it could become a series of films, and that Ares "[would] become a more proactive villain." A script had been "turned in" and the film had a budget of US$150 million. Following the release of 2018's God of War, with no updates on the original game's film, rumors about a potential adaptation of the 2018 game began circulating. Pacific Rim: Uprisings (2018) director Steven S. DeKnight stated he would like to direct an adaptation of that game and talked with Sony about making it R-rated. In May 2021, however, a Sony spokesperson confirmed that there was no God of War film adaptation in development.

Amazon Prime Video series
On March 7, 2022, Deadline reported that a live action television series was said to be in negotiations at Amazon Prime Video by Mark Fergus and Hawk Ostby, creators of The Expanse, and Rafe Judkins, the showrunner for The Wheel of Time. During an investor briefing on May 26, 2022, Sony Interactive Entertainment president Jim Ryan confirmed that a God of War television series was in development for Amazon Prime Video. The series was officially ordered on December 14, 2022. The adaptation is being produced by Sony Pictures Television and Amazon Studios in association with PlayStation Productions, and it will premiere on Prime Video in more than 240 countries and territories worldwide. It is being written by Fergus and Ostby, with Judkins serving as showrunner, who will all also be executive producers. Other executive producers include Santa Monica Studio's Creative Director Cory Barlog, PlayStation Productions' Asad Qizilbash and Carter Swan, Santa Monica Studio's Yumi Yang, and Vertigo Entertainment's Roy Lee. Santa Monica Studio's Jeff Ketcham will serve as a co-executive producer. It was also confirmed that the Prime Video series would adapt the Norse era, beginning with the events of the 2018 installment.

Documentaries

God of War: Unearthing the Legend (75 minutes, 2010) is a documentary about the God of War franchise and is hosted by Peter Weller. The production discusses the relationship between the God of War games and Greek mythology, and features members of the God of War III development team and professional historians. It was included as part of the God of War III Ultimate Edition (North America) and Ultimate Trilogy Edition (Europe, Australia, and New Zealand) packages. On March 25, 2010, it was released on the PlayStation Store in North America to purchase.

God of War – Game Directors Live (80 minutes, 2010) is a documentary featuring five game directors of the God of War series: David Jaffe (original God of War), Cory Barlog (just God of War II at the time), Ru Weerasuriya (Chains of Olympus), Stig Asmussen (God of War III), and Dana Jan (Ghost of Sparta). The documentary takes the form of an interview panel hosted by G4's Alison Haislip, with the five game directors, 150 members of PlayStation.Blog, and members of GodofWar.com and SpartansStandTall.com. It was filmed at the El Portal theater in Los Angeles on September 1, 2010, and was released as a pre-order bonus for Ghost of Sparta in North America on November 2, 2010, and was included with the Origins Collection and later released on the PlayStation Store.

Raising Kratos is a YouTube documentary of Santa Monica Studio's five-year process in making 2018's God of War, showing the "herculean effort" that went into reviving the franchise. The documentary was announced on April 20, 2019, the one year anniversary of the game's launch, and was released the following month on May 10.

Comic series and novels

A six-issue comic book series titled God of War, written by Marv Wolfman with art by Andrea Sorrentino, was published by WildStorm and DC Comics on a bi-monthly schedule from March 2010 to January 2011. Taking place during the Greek era, the narrative switches between Kratos' past and present; it occurs while he is a soldier of Sparta and involves his search for the Ambrosia of Asclepius, which has legendary healing properties and eventually saved his plague-ridden daughter, Calliope. Kratos also embarks upon a quest to destroy the same elixir to deny it to the worshippers of the slain god Ares, who wish to resurrect him. The series was collected into a trade paperback in March 2011.

In the lead up to Ascensions release, Santa Monica released a graphic novel titled Rise of the Warrior on the God of War website that featured a social experience from October 2012 until March 2013. The graphic novel was a prequel story that tied into the single-player of Ascension, and was the backstory of the player's multiplayer character.

A two-volume comic series was published by Dark Horse Comics and follows Kratos' journey between the events of God of War III and the 2018 installment. It was written by Chris Roberson with art by Tony Parker. The first volume, also titled God of War, was published monthly from November 2018 to February 2019; Issue #0 was included digitally with the three different special editions of the 2018 game and the four-issue volume serves as a direct prequel story to the game. The second volume, also four issues and subtitled Fallen God, was published monthly from March to June 2021; it was originally to begin publication in June 2020, but was delayed due to the COVID-19 pandemic. Taking place before the first volume, Fallen God covers the timespan from God of War III to that first volume. Both series were collected as trade paperbacks in May 2019 (Volume 1) and December 2021 (Volume 2), respectively.

The God of War novels recount the events of the games and offer deeper insights into their stories. God of War, the official novelization of the first game, was written by Matthew Stover and Robert E. Vardeman. It was published on May 25, 2010, by Del Rey Books. God of War II, the second novelization of the series, was written by Vardeman alone and was published by Del Rey Books on February 12, 2013. The third novelization in the series, titled God of War – The Official Novelization, is of 2018's God of War, skipping a novelization of God of War III. It was released on August 28, 2018, by Titan Books and was written by Cory Barlog's father, James Barlog.

Tabletop card game
An official tabletop card game titled God of War: The Card Game was released by CMON Limited on October 25, 2019. Created by Alexandru Olteanu and Fel Barros, the card game adapts the events of the 2018 installment. Players take on the role of the Norns, the Fates of Norse mythology, as they try to prevent Ragnarök with a different combination of characters and events from the game, providing many variations to completing the card game.

Music
Seven God of War soundtracks have been commercially released and have featured several composers, including Gerard K. Marino, Ron Fish, Winifred Phillips, Mike Reagan, Cris Velasco, Winnie Waldron, Marcello De Francisci, Jeff Rona, Tyler Bates, and Bear McCreary. On March 1, 2005, God of War: Original Soundtrack from the Video Game was released on CD by SIE as an exclusive product for the Sony Connect Music Store. It was praised for its well-developed orchestral themes, and the creative use of ancient and ethnic instrumentation. The composers were also praised for avoiding the production of never-ending action themes. God of War II: Original Soundtrack from the Video Game was released on CD by SIE on April 10, 2007. Praised as strong, the album features ominous orchestral pieces, and each composer's contributions are slightly more distinctive than the previous soundtrack. God of War III: Original Soundtrack from the Video Game was released on CD by SIE and Sumthing Else on March 30, 2010. It was also included as downloadable content in the God of War III Ultimate Edition and Ultimate Trilogy Edition collections. The soundtrack was praised as an orchestral success and the best score in the series at the time.

The original scores for God of War, God of War II, and God of War III were nominated for Best Original Score at the 2005, 2007, and 2010 Spike Video Game Awards, respectively. The God of War Trilogy Soundtrack was included with the God of War III Ultimate Edition and Ultimate Trilogy Edition collections as downloadable content. The Trilogy Soundtrack consists of the original scores for God of War, God of War II, and God of War III. It was praised by critics as the best way to experience the series' musical development, and allows the listener to note the development of the composers during the series.

On October 18, 2010, God of War: Ghost of Sparta – Original Soundtrack from the Video Game was released on the iTunes Store by SIE. It was also included as downloadable content as part of the Ghost of Sparta pre-order package and includes three previously unreleased tracks from Chains of Olympus. Several tracks were cited as being intended for purely contextual purposes, and the remaining tracks rated well in comparison to the soundtracks of the main installments in the series. God of War: Ascension (Original Soundtrack) differed from the previously released soundtracks as it was composed by Tyler Bates alone, and is the only God of War score that he has worked on. It was released on March 5, 2013, on iTunes by SIE and La-La Land Records. It was included as downloadable content in the God of War: Ascension–Collector's Edition and Special Edition. Reviewers praised it for being powerful, rich, and pulsing, though felt it was repetitive at times.

For both God of War (2018) and God of War Ragnarök, famed TV series composer Bear McCreary was employed to compose the music. God of War (PlayStation Soundtrack) was released on April 20, 2018, by Sony Classical Records. McCreary composed completely new music for the game, not reusing any music from the Greek era. However, he was inspired by their sounds, such as "deep choirs, pounding drums, and shrieking brass", and reinvented them for the Nordic setting using Nordic ethnic instruments. The soundtrack was well received, receiving various nominations at award shows as well as winning the award for Outstanding Achievement in Original Music Composition at the 22nd Annual D.I.C.E. Awards. God of War Ragnarök (Original Soundtrack) was released on November 9, 2022, by Sony Classical Records. Faroese singer Eivør was brought back to contribute to the soundtrack. Irish folk artist Hozier was also featured on the song, "Blood Upon the Snow".

God of War: Blood & Metal

God of War: Blood & Metal is a heavy metal homage by various bands on the Roadrunner Records label, and features original music inspired by the God of War video game series. The EP was released for purchase on March 2, 2010, and is available from ShockHound and the iTunes Store. It was also included as downloadable content in the God of War III Ultimate Edition and Ultimate Trilogy Edition collections, which included a bonus track. The second track, "Shattering the Skies Above" by Trivium, and the bonus track, "Even Gods Cry" by The Turtlenecks, were made into music videos. 1UP.com (2.5/5) said, "it's not offensive to [the] ears" and "mainstream listeners may enjoy [the album]". Square Enix Music Online (8/10) stated the album is a "good selection of metal music" and listeners will be "surprised with the variety of music".

Track listing

Critical reception

With physical and digital copies combined, the God of War franchise has sold over 51 million games worldwide (as of November 2020). God of War (2005), God of War II, Chains of Olympus, God of War Collection, God of War III, God of War (2018), and Ragnarök each received critical acclaim from several reviewers as compiled by review aggregator Metacritic, with the 2005, 2018, and Ragnarök titles being tied for the highest score in the franchise at 94/100. Betrayal and Ghost of Sparta only received generally favorable reception. Ascension also only had a generally favorable reception and, not including the PlayStation Vita port of God of War Collection, it has the lowest score in the series from Metacritic (80/100).

At the time of its release, Raymond Padilla of GameSpy wrote that the original God of War was the "best action game ever to grace the PS2". Other critics similarly said that it was one of the best action games of all time; it received over a dozen "Game of the Year" awards. In 2009, it was named the "seventh-best" PlayStation 2 game of all time on IGN's "Top 25 PS2 Games of All Time" list. God of War II was also on IGN's list, and was named the "second-best" PlayStation 2 game of all time. God of War II was similarly called one of the best action games of all time and is considered the swan song of the PlayStation 2 era. In November 2012, Complex.com named God of War II the best PlayStation 2 game of all time—where God of War was named the 11th best—and consider it better than its successor, God of War III. Betrayal was acclaimed for its fidelity to the series in terms of gameplay, art style, and graphics.

Chains of Olympus was praised for "fantastic" graphics and "tight and responsive" controls for the PSP at the time. In 2008, IGN awarded Chains of Olympus the "Best PSP Action Game", and in September 2010, it was listed as the best PSP game by GamePro. God of War III received praise for its graphics, in particular of Kratos; at the time, IGN stated that Kratos was "perhaps the single most impressive-looking character ever in videogames." IGN also said that, at the time, God of War III "redefines what the word 'scale' means with regards to videogames, as it throws you into scenes with Titans that are larger than entire levels in some other games." God of War III received awards for "Most Anticipated Game of 2010" and "Best PS3 Game" at the 2009 and 2010 Spike Video Game Awards, respectively. The game also won the "Artistic Achievement" award at the 2011 BAFTA awards. Ghost of Sparta was praised for its graphics and story, with Chris Pereira of 1UP saying that it was "a more personal story than the [previous] GOW games." It received several awards at E3 2010, including "Best Handheld Game", "Best PSP Game", and "PSP Game of Show", and won "Best Handheld Game" at the 2010 Spike Video Game Awards. 2018's God of War received particular praise for its art direction, graphics, combat system, music, story, use of Norse mythology, characters, and cinematic feeling. Many also felt that it had successfully revitalized the series without losing the core identity of its predecessors. It won several awards, among which were "Game of the Year" and "Best Game Direction" at The Game Awards 2018 and "Best Storytelling" and "PlayStation Game of the Year" at the 2018 Golden Joystick Awards.

The series has also received criticism because of problems with puzzles, weapons, and technical issues. Chains of Olympus was criticized by G4, who stated that the game "occasionally suffers from screen tearing and framerate drops", and that some of the puzzles "are so maddeningly difficult to solve". The game was also criticized for its lack of variety in enemies, its continued use of puzzles that require players to move boxes, and its relatively short story. God of War III also received some criticism. GameFront's Phil Hornshaw said it had an overly cruel protagonist, and the game assumed that the players reveled in the misery and violence as much as Kratos did. IGN complained about the game's weapons, and said "that two of the three additional weapons that you'll earn are extremely similar to your blades. They have unique powers and slightly different moves, but by and large, they're more of the same." Ghost of Sparta received criticism from Eurogamer, which said that the "game's primary problem ... is in its in-built focus" and that "there is a sense that Ghost of Sparta is a step back for the series if you've played [God of War III]." Some reviewers stated that Ascensions story was not as compelling as previous installments, with IGN stating that in comparison to Zeus and Ares, "the Furies don't quite cut it". The multiplayer received a mixed response. Although reviewers claimed gameplay translated well into the multiplayer, they were critical of the balance and depth of combat. Edge magazine approved of the multiplayer, stating it was an "evolutionary step" with "some fine ideas ... that [would] form part of this genre's future template." 2018's God of War received some criticism, for example, a couple of reviewers disliked that the fast travel option unlocked very late into the game.

The collections have also received praise. IGN (9.4/10) awarded God of War Collection (PS3) the "Editor's Choice" Award and praised the enhanced resolutions, lower price point and smoother frame rates, and stated it was the "definitive way to play the game[s]". Due to the success of God of War Collection, Sony announced that further titles would receive similar treatment for release under its new "Classics HD" brand. The Origins Collection was similarly well received. IGN (9/10) stated "Sony succeeded at making good games better", although GamePro criticized it for its lack of new bonus content. God of War Saga also received praise. Ryan Fleming of Digital Trends wrote that the collection "is perhaps the best value buy for any console available," although the collection is not likely for fans of the series, but rather inexperienced players or newcomers. God of War III Remastered was met with generally favorable reception. Praise was given to the smoother textures and improved frame rate, though because the original already had remarkable graphics, the changes were not major, and reviewers said these changes were not a strong enough argument to rebuy the game for US$40.

See also
Characters of God of War
Kratos (God of War)

Notes

References

Citations

Works cited

External links

 
Action-adventure video games by series
Hack and slash video games by series
Multiplayer and single-player video games
Sony Interactive Entertainment franchises
Video game franchises introduced in 2005
Video games adapted into comics
Video games set in antiquity
Video games set in the Viking Age
Video games set in Greece
Video games set in Norway
Greek and Roman deities in fiction
Video games based on Norse mythology
Fiction about revenge